Paul Shelley (born Paul Matthews; 15 May 1942) is an English actor.

Shelley was born in Leeds, West Riding of Yorkshire, and trained at RADA (Royal Academy of Dramatic Art). Since then he has mainly worked in the theatre as a classical actor. He has worked extensively with the Royal National Theatre and the Royal Shakespeare Company and has appeared in several West End productions.

Television and film roles 
His work for television includes A Tale of Two Cities (1980), the BBC Sunday classic serial in which he played the dual lead roles of Charles Darnay and Sydney Carton, Secret Army (1978–79) as Major Nicholas Bradley, The Fourth Arm (1979), Special Branch (1974), Blake's 7 (1979), Doctor Who (1982), Inspector Morse (1990), Paradise Postponed (1986) based on book by John Mortimer (audiobook-recorded by Paul Shelley as well) and its sequel Titmuss Regained (1991, also audiobook),, Revelations (1994–95), Heartbeat (2002) and Crossroads (2003). In the popular ITV detective drama Midsomer Murders episode "The Creeper" (2009) Shelley performed as Inspector Barnaby's boss, Chief Constable Richard Lovell and appeared as Jed Grey in several episodes in BBC TV series Doctors (2010).

Films include Oh! What a Lovely War (1969), Polanski's Macbeth (1971), It Shouldn't Happen to a Vet (1976) and God's Outlaw (1986).

Theatre roles 
Shelley played Duncan in Rupert Goold's production of Macbeth ("the Macbeth of a lifetime" according to critics) which after its sellout runs at Chichester Festival Theatre in summer 2007 was transferred to the West End in the autumn and then to New York from February to May 2008. During the Chichester season 2007 he also played Sir Toby Belch in Twelfth Night.

Other notable roles are: at Shakespeare's Globe: Julius Caesar (title role), Antony in Antony and Cleopatra, three Tom Stoppard plays in the West End The Invention of Love (Oscar Wilde), Arcadia (Bernard), The Real Thing (Henry), at Royal National Theatre: The Secret Rapture (Tom French), Hedda Gabler (Tesman), The Crucible (Hale), Lady in the Dark (Kendal), at Royal Shakespeare Company: Romeo and Juliet (Tybalt), King Lear (Edmund), The Winter’s Tale (Leontes), Troilus and Cressida (Achilles), Les liaisons dangereuses (Valmont). Shelley has also often worked at the Orange Tree Theatre in Richmond, as an actor and director, on such plays as Uncle Vanya and King Lear. For nine months he played Arthur Kipps in the thriller The Woman in Black at the Fortune Theatre (2006–07).

Shelley played Elyot Chase in Noël Coward's Private Lives at the Theatre Royal, York and returned there to direct Robert Bolt's A Man For All Seasons, in June 2008. He played the Duke of Norfolk in A Man For All Seasons, on tour and at the Haymarket in 2005-06. In a Donmar Warehouse production of T.S. Eliot's The Family Reunion he played Colonel Gerald Piper in a run from November 2008 to January 2009. At York's Theatre Royal from 30 May-20 June 2009 Paul played Max in Harold Pinter's The Homecoming. A Voyage Around My Father, by John Mortimer, with Paul Shelley playing the Father, was a Salisbury Playhouse production in autumn 2010. Rose Theatre, Kingston in March 2011 showed Shakespeare's As You Like It with Paul Shelley in the dual roles of Duke Frederick and Duke Senior. After that he played Ralph in Harold Pinter's 'Moonlight' at the Donmar Warehouse. "Earthquakes in London" by Mike Bartlett and directed by Rupert Goold was on UK tour until 12 November 2011 with Paul Shelley as the father, Robert. In June 2012 the Orange Tree Theatre showed The Conquering Hero with Paul Shelley as Colonel Rokeby. He played Andrew in Mike Bartlett's adaptation of "Medea" on tour until December 2012. Produced by Headlong. Theatre Royal Bath showed "King Lear" in July–August 2013 with Paul as the Earl of Gloucester. From 21 January to 8 February 2014 Royal Lyceum, Edinburgh showed Eugene O'Neill's "Long day's journey into night" with Paul playing the father, James Tyrone. "Brideshead Revisited" on UK tour April–June 2016 with Paul as Lord Marchmain.

Audiobooks 
He is also an audiobook narrator and has recorded some thirty audiobooks, among them John Fowles’ The French Lieutenant’s Woman, Kingsley Amis’ Lucky Jim, several of Robert Goddard's novels, James Cameron's An Indian Summer, Nicholas Crane's Two Degrees West and Staying On by Paul Scott. He has been called "the best reader there is" and has three times won the Audiofile Earphones Award.

Personal life 

Paul Shelley has toured and taught at universities in the USA. He is married to actress Paula Stockbridge and has a son and daughter from his previous marriage to actress Eileen Nicholas. His elder brother Francis Matthews was also an actor, and sister Maura Matthews.

Filmography

Film

Television

References

External links

1942 births
Living people
English Roman Catholics
English male film actors
English male stage actors
English male television actors
Alumni of RADA
male actors from Leeds